Hampala dispar, also known as the Eye-spot barb or the Spotted hampala barbis a southeast Asian species of cyprinid, endemic to the basin of the Mekong. It is found in Thailand, Laos and Cambodia.

Anatomy and appearance
Hampala dispar has a slender and flat-sided appearance. It has a very big mouth along with a pair of antennas besides them. Its most iconic feature is its black dot in each side of its body. Individuals may reach a length of 35 cm.

Hampala dispar is a predatory fish. It consumes fish and other smaller aquatic animals for food. It is consumed by fresh cooking, fermenting, and popularly raised as ornamental fish.

References

Cyprinid fish of Asia
Fish of the Mekong Basin
Fish of Cambodia
Fish of Laos
Fish of Thailand
Fish described in 1934